Jerzy Jan Wenderlich (pronounced ; born 22 April 1954 in Toruń) is a Polish politician. He was initially elected to Sejm in 1993, representing the Democratic Left Alliance, and was reelected in 1997, 2001, 2005 and 2007.

In the 2004 European Parliament elections he was a candidate of Democratic Left Alliance-Labor Union from Kuyavian-Pomeranian constituency. He polled 17,885 votes and was not elected.

He recontested the elections to the Sejm, on 25 September 2005, getting 10,761 votes in 5 Toruń district as a candidate from the Democratic Left Alliance list. He was reelected again at the 2007 parliamentary elections.

See also 
 Members of Polish Sejm 2005-2007

References

External links 
 Official site
 Jerzy Wenderlich - parliamentary page - includes declarations of interest, voting record, and transcripts of speeches.

1954 births
Living people
People from Toruń
Kazimierz Wielki University in Bydgoszcz alumni
Democratic Left Alliance politicians
Deputy Marshals of the Sejm of the Third Polish Republic
Members of the Polish Sejm 1993–1997
Members of the Polish Sejm 1997–2001
Members of the Polish Sejm 2001–2005
Members of the Polish Sejm 2005–2007
Members of the Polish Sejm 2007–2011
Democratic Left Alliance MEPs
MEPs for Poland 2004
Members of the Polish Sejm 2011–2015